is a train station on the West Japan Railway Company (JR West) Yamatoji Line (Kansai Main Line electrified section) in Hirano-ku, Osaka, Osaka Prefecture, Japan.  However, there is no connection with Shin-Kami Station on the Osaka Higashi Line.

Line
West Japan Railway Company (JR West) Yamatoji Line

Layout
There are two side platforms with two tracks on the ground.  Station building is located over the platforms and the tracks.

History 
Station numbering was introduced in March 2018 with Kami being assigned station number JR-Q23.

References 

Hirano-ku, Osaka
Railway stations in Osaka
Railway stations in Japan opened in 1909